Haji Atta Ur Rehman is a Pakistani politician who had been a member of the Provincial Assembly of the Punjab from August 2018 till January 2023.

Political career

He was elected to the Provincial Assembly of the Punjab as a candidate of Pakistan Muslim League (N) from Constituency PP-210 (Khanewal-VIII) in 2018 Pakistani general election.

Khadim-e-Jahanian

Haji Atta ur Rehman is social worker and known as Khadim-e-Jahanian in his constituency. He started his political career as City Nazim of Jahanian. During his tenure, he maintained the Electrification System, Drainage System and completed development projects in Jahanian.
He provided the constituency with Electricity, Gas, NADRA Office, Passport Office, Filtration Plants, Roads, Schools, Upgradation of Hospital, BZU Buss Shuttle Service and many more.

References

Living people
Pakistan Muslim League (N) MPAs (Punjab)
Year of birth missing (living people)